"Touchdown" is a song by American rapper T.I., taken from his fifth studio album T.I. vs. T.I.P. (2007). The song features vocals from fellow American rapper Eminem, who also produced the song alongside his frequent collaborator Jeff Bass. The song, although not officially released as a single received considerable airplay on the radio, as well as on Monday Night Football, during the 2007 NFL season.

Music and lyrics
Produced by Eminem and Jeff Bass, the song features the use of electronic keyboard giving a trumpet-like sound. As well, hi-hats and bass drums are the main rhythmic instruments used in the song.

The song mainly deals with the success of the T.I. and Eminem, as well as their struggle with their respective alter egos "T.I.P." and "Slim Shady". Eminem raps imitating a Southern American accent, typical of T.I. and his hometown Atlanta (Eminem is from Detroit). Also, in the third and last verse T.I. explains his gratitude toward hip hop and criticizes people that disagree with the lyrical content of the music genre:

In 2009, Eminem later stated he feels his verse on the song was "horrible".

Track listing

Notes
 signifies an additional producer.

Charts

References

2007 singles
Eminem songs
T.I. songs
Grand Hustle Records singles
Song recordings produced by Eminem
Songs written by Eminem
Songs written by T.I.
2007 songs
Songs written by Jeff Bass